Sixer is a 2007 Indian Kannada language film about a teenager who dreams of becoming a cricket player and who works for an underworld don, only to fall in love with the daughter of his boss's rival. The film marks the debut of director Shashank and Prajwal Devaraj and was released with average reviews and performed positive at the box office.

Cast
 Prajwal Devaraj as Rahul
 Avinash as Shyam
 Rangayana Raghu as  Malpe Nayaka
 Mandeep Roy
 Adi Lokesh as Khandre
 Devaki as Swathi 
 Chitra Shenoy
 Yash Hemani

Reception

Critical response 

R G Vijayasarathy of Rediff.com scored the film at 2.5 out of 5 stars and says "Rangayana Raghu overacts and Aadi Lokesh should certainly change his stylised dialogue delivery. The camerawork is ordinary when compared to current Cinema. Sixer is a good debut for Prajwal and a film that won't bore you."

References

External links
Sixer Cast and Crew
Sixer Review at Nowrunning.com

2007 films
2000s Kannada-language films
Films directed by Shashank
Indian teen films
Indian action films
Films scored by Hamsalekha
2007 action films
2000s teen films